One is a 2017 Indian Bengali language crime thriller film directed by Birsa Dasgupta under the banner of Shree Venkatesh Films. The film stars Yash Dasgupta, Nusrat Jahan in the lead roles and Prosenjit Chatterjee in the antagonist role in the movie. It is a remake of Tamil film Thani Oruvan (2015). The movie was released on 14 April 2017 all over the theatres in India.

Plot
Ronojoy and his friends are trainee policemen who are also self-appointed vigilantes at night. Aditya Sen, an exceptionally cunning and prodigious scientist, owns and runs a pharmaceutical empire. The national mafia and contract killer works on Aditya's word. Ronojoy, with his sharp thinking and instinct, is suspicious of Aditya, for a number of seemingly unconnected criminal events, for which he secretly carries out an unofficial investigation. Trouble mounts when Aditya becomes suspicious of his intentions, and murders Ronojoy's friend Abhijeet, an honest policeman. Later Ronojoy finds that Aditya is able to  detect all his plan by satellite communication, and he misdirected Ronojoy to kill Vicky. Ronojoy later collected all the pieces of evidence against Aditya and completely shattered him. At last, it is shown that Aditya died because of a gunshot from his own girlfriend, and handovering all the secret information against the ministers which would be helpful as eveidence/proofs in future.

Cast
 Yash Dasgupta as Ronojoy Bose IPS 
 Prosenjit Chatterjee as Aditya Sen, the main antagonist
 Nusrat Jahan as Megha
 Supriyo Dutta as MLA-turned-Minister Gobardhan Sen, Aditya's father
 Rajat Ganguly as Chief Minister
 Bharat Kaul as leader of the dock syndicate Damodar Pandey
 Arjun Chakrabarty as Abhijeet IPS
 Rajib Bose
 Abhishek Bose
 Anil Kuriakose as Kamlesh Tripathi, Coal mafia
 Rachel White as Bipasha, Aditya's girlfriend
 Aryann Roy as Vicky
 Debdoot Ghosh as Ashok Ganguly, Pharmaceutical industry head
 Bulbuli Panja
 Satyam Bhattacharya
 Frederico Machado Freitas
 Krishnendu Adhikari

Soundtrack

References

External links
 

Bengali-language Indian films
2010s Bengali-language films
2017 crime action films
2017 crime thriller films
2017 action thriller films
2017 films
Indian action thriller films
Medical-themed films
Indian crime action films
Films scored by Arindam Chatterjee
Indian crime thriller films
Films directed by Birsa Dasgupta
Bengali remakes of Tamil films